Hazelle P. Rogers (born September 28, 1952) is a Democratic member of the Broward County Commission. She was a Democratic member of the Florida House of Representatives and was the Mayor of Lauderdale Lakes. She formerly represented the 95th District, which includes North Lauderdale, Lauderdale Lakes, and Lauderhill in northern Broward County, from 2012 to 2016, previously representing the 94th District from 2008 to 2012, before redistricting took place. She won an election to the Broward County Commission on August 23, 2022. She was sworn into this position in November of 2022.

History
Rogers was born in Kingston, Jamaica, and moved to New York City in 1969 as a 17 year-old. Rogers attended New York City Community College, where she graduated with an associate degree in 1976. She attended Pace University in 1980, but did not graduate. In 1982, Rogers relocated to the state of Florida, where she became the Secretary of the Eastgate Homeowners Association.

Rogers was elected to the Lauderdale Lakes City Commission in 1996, where she served until she was elected to the legislature. While serving on the City Commission, Rogers graduated from the University of Phoenix with a degree in business in 2003.

Florida House of Representatives
When incumbent State Representative Matthew Meadows, was unable to seek re-election in 2008 due to term limits, she ran to succeed him in the 94th District, which ran from Broward Estates to North Lauderdale in Broward County. In the Democratic primary, Rogers faced Eric Hammond, Kenneth Thurston, Roshawn Banks, Robert Lynch, and Rubin Young. She campaigned on "curbing rising property taxes" and on providing affordable housing to the community. Rogers emerged victorious in the primary, winning 39% of the vote to Hammond's 27%, Thurston's 21%, Banks's 5%, Lynch's 5%, and Young's 3%.

She won the general election unopposed. When she ran for re-election in 2010, she was challenged in the Democratic primary by John Labriola, who campaigned on outlawing abortion and same-sex marriage, arguing that the party had become too liberal, saying, "We need to get our moral house in order if we ever hope to fix the economy and get America prosperous again." She defeated Labriola easily with 88% of the vote, advancing to the general election, where she was once again elected unopposed.

While serving in the legislature in 2011, Rogers authored legislation with State Senator Gary Siplin that required school districts to "adopt a dress code that prohibits students from 'wearing clothing that exposes underwear or body parts in an indecent or vulgar manner,'" calling it a "pro-family, pro-education, pro-jobs bill" that would "make for a better school district and more productive students."

In 2012, when state legislative districts were redrawn, Rogers was moved into the 95th District, which included much of the territory that she had previously represented in the 94th District. She won both the primary and general election entirely unopposed.

Broward County Commission 
Rogers joined the Broward County Commission in 2022, after winning the seat formerly held by Dale Holness, in an August 2022 election. She was endorsed by fellow Commissioner Steve Geller, beating Guithele Ruiz-Nicolas, a political novice. Rogers won in spite of questions about payments she sent to a Delaware company with the same address as her campaign.

Recognition 
In 2020, Rogers received the Order of Distinction from the government of Jamaica.

References

External links
Florida House of Representatives - Hazelle Rogers
Rogers for State House

1952 births
Living people
Politicians from Kingston, Jamaica
Politicians from New York City
City College of New York alumni
Pace University alumni
University of Phoenix alumni
Businesspeople from Florida
Florida city council members
Women state legislators in Florida
Democratic Party members of the Florida House of Representatives
Women city councillors in Florida
People from Lauderdale Lakes, Florida
African-American city council members in Florida
American politicians of Jamaican descent
Jamaican emigrants to the United States
African-American women in politics
21st-century African-American people
21st-century African-American women
20th-century African-American people
20th-century African-American women